The Estonian Lutheran Association of Peace (Estonian: Eesti Luterlik Rahuühendus) is a conservative laestadians organization in Estonia. It has one Association of Peace in Tartu. It does mission work in Tallinn, Tartu and Southeast Estonia. It has sister organizations in Finland, Sweden and North America.

See also
Conservative Laestadianism
Laestadianism
Laestadianism in America
Association of Peace
SRK, Suomen rauhanyhdistysten keskusyhdistys
SFC, Sveriges fridsföreningarnas centralorganisation
Laestadian Lutheran Church

Laestadianism
Lutheranism in Estonia
Lutheran organizations